The Facility for Airborne Atmospheric Measurements (FAAM), based on the Cranfield University campus alongside Cranfield Airport in Bedfordshire, England, is an organisation formed by a collaboration between the Met Office and the Natural Environment Research Council (NERC).

The facility
FAAM was established jointly by the Natural Environmental Research Council and the Met Office, the former having primary management and doing so as part of the National Centre for Atmospheric Science (NCAS), which is itself part of NERC, to provide aircraft measurement for use by UK atmospheric research organisations on worldwide campaigns. The main equipment is a modified BAe 146 type 301 aircraft, registration G-LUXE, owned by BAE Systems and operated for them by the company Directflight Limited.

Work carried out by FAAM includes
 Radiative transfer studies in clear and cloudy air;
 Tropospheric chemistry measurements;
 Cloud physics and dynamic studies;
 Dynamics of mesoscale weather systems;
 Boundary layer and turbulence studies;
 Remote sensing: verification of ground-based instruments;
 Satellite ground truth: radiometric measurements and winds;
 Satellite instrument test-bed;

FAAM is staffed by a mixture of NERC, University of Leeds and Met Office personnel, and acts as a servant to numerous UK and occasionally overseas science organisations; primarily the Met Office itself, or UK universities funded by NERC. It flies around 400 hours annually, most commonly on large campaigns where a team of typically 30 will spend around a month at a base location, potentially anywhere in the world, delivering a specific science campaign, although some flying from Cranfield also takes place.  An emergency response role exists, which has been used three times - at the 2005 Buncefield fire, the 2010 Eyjafjallajökull volcanic eruption and 2012 Total Elgin gas platform leak; subsequent to Eyjafjallajökull a new aircraft, MOCCA - the Met Office Civil Contingency Aircraft, a converted Cessna 421 aircraft has been commissioned as the "first responder" to British volcanic ash emergencies.

The facility was originally established in 2001, with an intended operating base of the BAe site at Woodford, in Cheshire. However, by 2004 when the aircraft was delivered, BAe had decided to close Woodford, so eventually the facility was re-sited at Cranfield, although it initially had limited involvement with that university, the largest university customers being Manchester, Cambridge, Leeds and York.  Since 2016 FAAM has been co-located in a new dedicated building with a new department of Atmospheric Informatics of Cranfield University, and its involvement with Cranfield is becoming closer.

From 2008 - 2014 FAAM was headed by Dr. Guy Gratton, an aeronautical engineer; it is now headed by Mr Alan Woolley, an instrumentation scientist.

See also
 Hertfordshire Oil Storage Terminal
 2005 Hertfordshire Oil Storage Terminal fire

References

Atmospheric sounding
Climate of England
Cranfield University
Governmental meteorological agencies in Europe
Met Office
Meteorological data and networks
Natural Environment Research Council
Science and technology in Bedfordshire
University of Leeds
Air pollution in the United Kingdom